Ilias Haddad (born 1 March 1989, Dordrecht) is a Moroccan footballer who plays as a centre back for Union Touarga . Haddad holds both Dutch and Moroccan nationality.

Career
As a youth, Haddad spent time with VV Merwesteijn, Feyenoord and SBV Excelsior, where he signed his first professional contract before moving to AZ. He made his professional debut at first division club Telstar, where he played on loan.

Haddad signed for Scottish Premier League club St Mirren on 19 August 2011, that keep him until January. He joined fellow Dutchman Jeroen Tesselaar, who Haddad played alongside at Telstar. Haddad made his debut, the next day on 20 August 2011, coming on as a substitute for Paul McGowan, in a 2–1 win over Hibernian. In September, Haddad hints he might extend his contract with his contract is about to expire in January. In November 2011, Manager Danny Lennon says he hopes Haddad to sign a new contract, that will keep him until the end of the season despite suffering a family bereavement. In late-December, Lennon says he will be withdrawing Haddad's contract, citing financial problem

After leaving St Mirren, Haddad then moved to Bulgaria by joining CSKA Sofia until the end of the season. At first, CSKA Sofia confirmed their interest in signing Haddad, having joined them on trial. However, he would make just three appearances before being released by the club.

After six-months without a club, Haddad signed for FC Dordrecht until the end of the season. His debut didn't go according to plan when he came off in the first half of the match, which Dordrecht lost 6–1 against Volendam.

Later on, Haddad played for AS FAR and Raja Casablanca in Morocco.

International career
Despite being born in Morocco, Haddad has been capped for the Netherlands at Under 18 and Under 19 level.

Honours
Raja Casablanca 
Moroccan League: 2020
CAF Confederation Cup: 2018, 2021
CAF Super Cup: 2019
In 2006–07, Haddad was awarded the best player of Eredivisie A-Juniors.

References

External links
 Voetbal International profile 
 Ilias Haddad Interview

1989 births
Living people
Dutch footballers
Dutch expatriate footballers
Association football defenders
SC Telstar players
St Mirren F.C. players
PFC CSKA Sofia players
FC Dordrecht players
AS FAR (football) players
Raja CA players
Eredivisie players
Eerste Divisie players
Scottish Premier League players
First Professional Football League (Bulgaria) players
Expatriate footballers in Scotland
Expatriate footballers in Bulgaria
Dutch sportspeople of Moroccan descent
Footballers from Dordrecht